Turmoil may refer to:

 Turmoil (1984 video game), a 1984 video game released by Bug-Byte
 Turmoil (2016 video game), a 2016 indie oil tycoon video game
 Turmoil (Transformers), a fictional character
 Turmoil, a character in the American television series SWAT Kats: The Radical Squadron
 "Turmoil", a Skrillex song released on MySpace in 2010

See also
 The Turmoil (disambiguation)